The 2012 Rhondda Cynon Taf Council election took place on Thursday 3 May 2012 to elect members of Rhondda Cynon Taf County Borough Council in Wales. This was the same day as other United Kingdom local elections. It was preceded by the 2008 election and the next full council election took place on 4 May 2017.

Election result
Labour remained in firm control of the council, after gaining an additional 16 seats. However, the leader of the council, Labour councillor Russell Roberts, lost his seat  to an Independent candidate (in the Tonyrefail East ward) by 34 votes.

|}

Ward results

Aberaman North (2 seats)

Aberaman South (2 seats)

Abercynon (2 seats)

Aberdare East (2 seats)

Aberdare West / Llwydcoed (3 seats)

Beddau (1 seat)

Brynna (1 seat)
Roger Turner, elected as an Independent in 2004 and 2008 stood as a Labour candidate.

Church Village (1 seat)

Cilfynydd (1 seat)

Cwm Clydach (1 seat)

Cwmbach (1 seat)

Cymmer (2 seats)

Ferndale (2 seats)

Gilfach Goch (1 seat)

Glyncoch (1 seat)

Graig (1 seat)

Hawthorn (1 seat)

Hirwaun (1 seat)

Llanharan (1 seat)

Llanharry (1 seat)

Llantrisant Town (1 seat)

Llantwit Fardre (2 seats)

Llwyn-y-pia (1 seat)

Maerdy (1 seats)

Mountain Ash East (1 seat)

Mountain Ash West (2 seats)

Penrhiwceiber (2 seats)

Pentre (2 seats)

Pen-Y-Graig (2 seats)

Pen-Y-Waun (1 seat)

Pont-Y-Clun (2 seats)

Pontypridd Town (1 seat)

Porth (2 seats)

Rhigos (1 seat)

Rhondda (2 seats)

Rhydfelen Central / Ilan (1 seat)

Taffs Well (1 seat)

Talbot Green (1 seat)

Ton-Teg (2 seats)

Tonypandy (1 seat)

Tonyrefail East (2 seats)

Tonyrefail West (1 seat)

Trallwng (1 seat)

Trealaw (1 seat)

Treforest (1 seat)

Treherbert (2 seats)

Treorchy (3 seats)

Tylorstown (2 seats)

Tyn-Y-Nant (1 seat)

Ynyshir (1 seat)

Ynysybwl (1 seat)

Ystrad (2 seats)

References

External links
Election Results 2012, Rhonda Cynon Taf website

Rhondda
2012